Prince Andrew: The Musical is a British made-for-television biographical musical comedy film written by and starring Kieran Hodgson. The musical is a "satirical send-up" of the life of Prince Andrew, Duke of York and covers key events during his life, including his relationships, controversies, and his infamous 2019 interview with journalist Emily Maitlis. 

The musical aired on Channel 4 on 29 December 2022 and also stars Emma Sidi as Maitlis, Munya Chawawa as Andrew's brother King Charles III and Harry Enfield as former Prime Minister Tony Blair. It is part of the network's newly commissioned programmes to mark its 40th anniversary and was first announced in August 2022 at the Edinburgh International Television Festival.

Plot 
The show begins with a recreation of Prince Andrew's Newsnight interview with Emily Maitlis, interspersed with real footage. Once the interview is over, they each believe that they 'nailed' the interview ("I Nailed It"). History then rewinds itself to 1982, when Andrew was growing up. He reflects on how he was always more popular than his brother, Prince Charles, and that in a time of public anxiety over inflation and the Falklands war, he had been able to take advantage of not being the heir by crafting a more stylish and down-to-earth version of himself that the public swoons over ("England Expects").

At Royal Ascot 1985, Andrew makes a pass at Sarah Ferguson, whom he has not seen since childhood, and offers her a profiterole. In her mind, she unravels the metaphor of the profiterole representing the material luxury that Andrew could offer her in marriage, and accepts ("My Profiterole"). They get married, but the deterioration between Sarah and the media forces the two to separate, and eventually in the spring of 1996, Andrew divorces Sarah ("Will You Be My Ex Wife?")

In 2001, as he retires from the Royal Navy, Andrew accepts Prime Minister Tony Blair's offer of becoming a trade envoy, and when he believes that it would benefit his role to befriend the rich and influential, Ghislaine Maxwell introduces him to Jeffrey Epstein ("A Different Kind of Duty"). As Andrew's extravagance with spending taxpayer money on luxuries like private jet flights comes to light in 2010, along with the cash for access scandal, Prince Charles wishes that his brother would conform to the image that he wants to craft for the Royal Family in time for his accession to the throne ("Obey").

In the wake of the Newsnight interview, Charles confronts Andrew and tells him to withdraw from public life and return his military titles. Andrew is initially defiant, but after a news bulletin reveals to them both that he has just settled his lawsuit with Virginia Giuffre, Charles pressures him further. Andrew responds by insisting that in order to take media attention away from the wrongdoings of the rest of the royals, they need to keep him around as a scapegoat ("You're Always Gonna Need An Andrew"). As an unimpressed Charles leaves Andrew solitarily dancing, the screen fades to black and the cast perform a mock curtain call ("Bows & Credits").

Cast 
 Kieran Hodgson as Prince Andrew
 Emma Sidi as Emily Maitlis
 Munya Chawawa as Prince Charles
 Jenny Bede as Sarah Ferguson
 Harry Enfield as Tony Blair
 Baga Chipz as Margaret Thatcher
 Joe Wilkinson as newspaper vendor

Musical numbers 
Seven original musical numbers were created. All tracks have music by Kieran Hodgson, and lyrics by Hodgson and Freddie Tapner - both except where noted, ("Obey", Munya Chawawa, Pippa Cleary).

Orchestration 
The music was recorded by the London Musical Theatre Orchestra in Angel Studios, conducted by Freddie Tapner. The 32-piece orchestra consisted of six woodwinds, two french horns, three trumpets, three trombones, drums, percussion, guitar, piano, bass, harp, 8 violins, 2 violas and 2 cellos. The orchestrations were by Simon Nathan.

Release 
On 23 December 2022, the soundtrack album was released onto streaming services. The album cover, which shares the continuity logo seen within the show's television broadcast, is a visual parody of the PizzaExpress logo; this is a reference to Andrew's alibi that he was at the PizzaExpress in Woking on the day that he allegedly had sex with Virginia Giuffre. 

On 29 December 2022, the day of the broadcast, a mobile billboard was placed outside the PizzaExpress in Woking to publicise the show - reading "If you miss it, you'd better have a decent alibi".

Reception 
The Birmingham Mail reported that social media postings gave mixed reviews of Prince Andrew: The Musical, with many finding the musical in poor taste.

Professional critical reviews were also mixed. In a positive review, giving the musical four stars, Tina Campbell for the Evening Standard said it was "certainly worth a watch" and called it "the satirical musical that nobody asked Father Christmas for, but what you're getting anyway is actually quite good". Playing on the name of the opening number, Carol Midgley for The Times said "this spoof nailed it", awarding three stars. Also awarding three stars, Anita Singh of The Telegraph said that it was "better than it has any right to be, thanks to some clever writing".

Lucy Mangan for The Guardian awarded three stars, but added that it "never quite flies" and that the Epstein scandal has been "played for laughs in a way that is not OK". One of the more outright negative reviews came from Alex Moreland of National World, awarding the musical only half a star, calling it "embarrassing" and a "contender for the worst TV (program) of 2022". Louis Chilton for The Independent called the musical "tasteless", adding that it "should have never been made".

References 

2020s biographical films
2020s English-language films
2020s musical comedy films
2022 television films
British biographical films
British musical comedy films
Films based on biographies
Films shot in London
Musical television films
Musical films based on actual events
Prince Andrew, Duke of York